South Branch Newport Creek is a tributary of Newport Creek in Luzerne County, Pennsylvania, in the United States. The entire watershed of the creek is considered by the Pennsylvania Department of Environmental Protection to be impaired. Mining has also been done in the watershed.

Course

South Branch Newport Creek begins in strip mines near the community of Wanamie in Newport Township. The headwaters are located north of Penobscot Mountain. The creek flows east for some distance before gradually turning north slightly west of the community of Alden. It then flows into the western part of Nanticoke, where it joins Newport Creek.

Tributaries
South Branch Newport Creek has one named tributary, which is known as Reservoir Creek. It also has an unnamed tributary.

Hydrology
The concentration of iron at this location is 0.26 milligrams per liter.

The concentration at this location is 1.61 milligrams per liter. The manganese concentration downstream of the Sheatown Discharge is 2.22 milligrams per liter.

The concentration of aluminum at this location is 2.00 milligrams per liter.

The concentration of acidity at this location is 33.80 milligrams per liter.

The discharge of South Branch Newport Creek at its headwaters ranges from 0.010 to 0.133 cubic feet per second, with an average of 0.052 cubic feet per second. The discharge of the creek downstream of UNT 28346 ranges from 0.085 to 2.276 cubic feet per second and the average discharge is 0.933 cubic feet per second. Below the Sheatown Discharge, it ranges from 0.127 to 4.492 cubic feet per second, with an average of 1.644 cubic feet per second. Above the mouth, it ranges from 0.424 to 5.284 cubic feet per second and the average is 2.216 cubic feet per second.

Geology, geography, and climate
South Branch Newport Creek is entirely in the ridge and valley geographical region of the Appalachian Mountains. The southern part of the watershed is on Little Wilkes-Barre Mountain.

79 percent of the rock in the watershed of South Branch Newport Creek belongs to the Llwellyn Formation. 7 percent belongs to the Pottsville Group, 7 percent belongs to the Mauch Chunk Formation, and 7 percent belongs to the Pocono Formation. 70 percent of the soil in the watershed is of the Udorthents-Urban Land-Volusia series. The remaining 30 percent belongs to the Lackawanna-Arnot-Morris series.

The Llwellyn Formation occupies all of the northern and central reaches of the South Branch Newport Creek watershed. South of the Llwellyn Formation is the Pottsville Formation. South of the Pottsville Formation is the Mauch Chunk Formation and then the Pocono Formation. The southernmost reaches of the watershed are occupied by rock of the Duncannon Member formation. The area near the mouth of the creek, it flows over a coal sheet called Sheet III. South of the middle reaches of the tributary Reservoir Creek, all of the soil belongs to the Lackawanna-Arnot-Morris series. North of this area, the soil all belongs to the Udorthents-Urban Land-Volusia series.

There is some drift on the banks of South Branch Newport Creek, but not as much as on Newport Creek itself.

Watershed
South Branch Newport Creek's watershed has an area of 5.05 square miles. 58 percent of the land is forested land, 28 percent is developed land, 13 percent is agricultural land, and 1 percent of the land is in other categories. Most of the watershed is in Newport Township and Nanticoke, but the southwestern edge of the watershed is on the border between Newport Township and Slocum Township.

Most of the developed land in the South Branch Newport Creek watershed is in the central part of the watershed, around the community of Wanamie or in the northeast part of the watershed, in Nanticoke. Forested land is found throughout the watershed, except for the northeast part. Agricultural land is mostly found in the central part of the watershed and disturbed land is mostly found in the western reaches of it.

The headwaters of South Branch Newport Creek can be accessed by State Route 3004.

In the late 1800s, there was a swamp at the headwaters of South Branch Newport Creek.

History
In 1874, there was a large release of quicksand at the Alden shaft on South Branch Newport Creek. Several collieries discharged into South Branch Newport Creek in the early 1900s.

See also
List of rivers of Pennsylvania

Notes

References

Rivers of Luzerne County, Pennsylvania
Tributaries of the Susquehanna River
Rivers of Pennsylvania